The Deauville Asian Film Festival (the Festival du film asiatique de Deauville) takes place annually in Deauville, France since 1999 and focuses on Asian cinema.  A film competition was added to the festival in 2000 and a video competition in 2002.

Prize List

2000
 Lotus d'Or (Prix du Jury) ("Jury Prize"):  Sur la Trace du Serpent ("Nowhere to Hide"), directed by Lee Myung-se
 Lotus du Public (Prix du Public) ("Popular Choice"):  The Mistress, directed by Crystal Kwok 
 Lotus de la Meilleure Photographie ("Best Photography"):  Jeong Kwang-Seok and Song Haeng-ki, for Sur la Trace du Serpent ("Nowhere to Hide") 
 Lotus de la Meilleure Actrice ("Best Actress"):  Tao Hong, for Hei Yanjing ("Colors of the Blind") directed by Chen Guoxing 
 Lotus du Meilleur Acteur ("Best Actor"):  Park Joong-hoon, for Sur la Trace du Serpent ("Nowhere to Hide") 
 Lotus du Meilleur Réalisateur:  Lee Myung-se, for Sur la Trace du Serpent ("Nowhere to Hide")

2001
 Lotus d'Or (Prix du Jury) ("Jury Prize"):  Joint Security Area, directed by Park Chan-wook 
 Lotus du Public (Prix du Public) ("Popular Choice"):  Joint Security Area, directed by Park Chan-wook 
 Lotus de la Meilleure Photographie  ("Best Photography"):  Takashiro Tsutai, for Hotoke, directed by Jinsei Tsuji 
 Lotus de la Meilleure Actrice ("Best Actress"):  Yu Nan, for Yue shi, directed by Wang Quan'an 
 Lotus du Meilleur Acteur ("Best Actor"):  Song Kang-ho, for Joint Security Area, directed by Park Chan-wook 
 Lotus du Meilleur Réalisateur:  Tanit Jitnukul for Bang Rajan
 Lotus du Meilleur Réalisateur:  Yiwen Chen and Huakun Zhang, for The Cabbie

2002
 Lotus d'Or (Prix du Jury) ("Jury Prize"):  Failan, directed by Song Hae-sung 
 Lotus du Public (Prix du Public) ("Popular Choice"):  Failan, directed by Song Hae-sung 
 Lotus de la Meilleure Photographie ("Best Photography"):  Youyuan Jingmeng ("Peony Pavilion"), directed by Yonfan 
 Lotus de la Meilleure Actrice ("Best Actress"):  Dian Sastrowardoyo for Pasir Berbisik ("Whispering Sands")
 Lotus du Meilleur Acteur ("Best Actor"):  Choi Min-sik for Failan
 Lotus du Meilleur Réalisateur:  Song Hae-sung for Failan
 Lotus du Meilleur Scénario:  The Rule of the Game, directed by Ho Ping
 Lotus Numérique:  Gipusu (Gips), directed by Akihiko Shiota
 Lotus Numérique:  Tokyo Gomi Onna ("Tokyo Trash Baby"), directed by Ryuichi Hiroki

2003
 Lotus d'Or (Prix du Jury) ("Jury Prize"):  Blind Shaft, directed by Li Yang
 Lotus du Public (Prix du Public) ("Popular Choice"):  Blind Shaft, directed by Li Yang
 Lotus de la Meilleure Actrice ("Best Actress"):  Rachel Sayidina and Jajang C. Noer for Eliana, Eliana
 Lotus du Meilleur Acteur ("Best Actor"):  Wang Baoqiang for Blind Shaft
 Lotus du Meilleur Réalisateur:  Li Yang for Blind Shaft
 Lotus numérique:  Koboreru Tsuki ("Moon Overflowing"), directed by Ryota Sakamaki
 Lotus Air France, Décerné par la Presse:  Blind Shaft

2004
 Lotus du Meilleur Film (Grand Prix):  Une Femme Coréenne ("A Good Lawyer's Wife"), directed by Im Sang-soo
 Lotus du Public (Prix du Public) ("Popular Choice"):  Voyageurs and Magiciens ("Travellers and Magicians"), directed by Khyentse Norbu
 Lotus Action Asia (Grand Prix Action Asia):  Ong-bak, directed by Prachya Pinkaew

2005
 Lotus du Meilleur Film (Grand Prix):  Mengyou Hawaii ("Holiday Dreaming"), directed by Fun-chun Hsu
 Lotus du Jury (Prix du Jury) ("Jury Prize"):  This Charming Girl, directed by Lee Yoon-ki
 Lotus du Meilleur Scénario (Prix du Groupe Lucien Barrière):  The World, directed by Jia Zhangke
 Lotus Action Asia (Grand Prix Action Asia):  Arahan, directed by Ryoo Seung-wan
 Lotus Air France (Prix de la Critique Internationale):  Mengyou Hawaii ("Holiday Dreaming"), directed by Fun-chun Hsu
 Lotus Première (Prix du Magazine Première):  Electric Shadows, directed by Xiao Jiang

2006
 Lotus du Meilleur Film ("Best Film"):  Dam Street, Li Yu
 Lotus du Jury ("Jury Prize"):  Piteopaeneui Gongshik ("The Peter Pan Formula") directed by Cho Chang-ho
 Lotus de la Critique Internationale:   Citizen Dog
 Lotus du Meilleur Scénario:   Cherm ("Midnight My Love")
Lotus Action Asia (Grand Prix Action Asia):  A Bittersweet Life directed by Kim Jee-woon

2007
 Lotus du Meilleur Film ("Best Film"):  Syndromes and a Century directed by Apichatpong Weerasethakul
 Lotus du Jury ("Jury Prize"):  King and the Clown directed by Lee Joon-ik
 Lotus Air France (Prix de la Critique Internationale) ("International Critics' Prize):  Ad-lib Night directed by Lee Yoon-ki
 Lotus Action Asia:  Dog Bite Dog directed by Soi Cheang

2008
 Lotus du Meilleur Film ("Best Film"):  With a Girl of Black Soil directed by Jeon Soo-il
 Lotus du Jury ("Jury Prize"):  Flower in the Pocket directed by Seng Tat Liew and  Wonderful Town directed by Aditya Assarat
 Lotus Air France (Prix de la Critique Internationale) ("International Critics' Prize):  With a Girl of Black Soil directed by Jeon Soo-il

2009
 Lotus du Meilleur Film ("Best Film"):   Breathless directed by Yang Ik-june
 Lotus du Jury ("Jury Prize"):   All around us directed by Ryosuke Hashiguchi and   The Shaft directed by Zhang Chi
 Lotus Air France (Prix de la Critique Internationale) ("International Critics' Prize):  Breathless directed by Yang Ik-june 
 Lotus Action Asia:  The Chaser directed by Na Hong-jin

2010
 Lotus du Meilleur Film ("Best Film"):  Judge directed by Liu Jie
 Lotus du Jury ("Jury Prize"):  Au Revoir Taipei directed by Arvin Chen and  Paju directed by Park Chan-ok 
 Lotus Air France (Prix de la Critique Internationale) ("International Critics' Prize):  My Daughter directed by Charlotte Lim Lay Kuen
 Lotus Action Asia:  The Sword with No Name directed by Kim Yong-gyun

See also
 Deauville American Film Festival

External links
 Official site

1999 establishments in France
Deauville
Deauville
Film festivals established in 1999